Les Quatre-Routes-du-Lot (Languedocien: Las Quatre Rotas) is a former commune in the Lot department in south-western France. On 1 January 2019, it was merged into the new commune Le Vignon-en-Quercy.

See also
Communes of the Lot department

References

Quatreroutesdulot